Good Night, Oscar is a Broadway play written by Doug Wright. It is scheduled to begin previews at the Belasco Theatre on April 7, 2023, with the premiere set for April 24 and a planned closing date of August 27, 2023.

Premise 
The show follows a 1958 episode of The Tonight Show, where host Jack Paar has as a guest comedian Oscar Levant.

Production 
The show first premiered in 2022 at the Goodman Theatre in Chicago, with Sean Hayes as Oscar Levant. The production ran from March 12 until April 24, 2022.

The Broadway production is directed by Lisa Peterson, with set design by Rachel Hauck, costume design by Emilio Sosa, lighting design by Carolina Ortiz Herrera and Ben Stanton, sound design by Andre Pluess, music supervision by Chris Fenwick, and wig, hair, and make-up design by J. Jared Janas.

Rehearsals for the show began on March 13, 2023.

Cast

Reception 
The Chicago production received positive reviews from the Chicago Tribune, Chicago Sun-Times, Hyde Park Herald, and WTTW, among others, with Hayes' performance being especially noted.

External links 

 Official website
 Good Night, Oscar at the IBDB

References 

2022 plays
Broadway plays
Cultural depictions of comedians
George Gershwin
One-act plays
Plays based on actual events
Plays set in the 1950s
Plays set in New York City
The Tonight Show